Lam Tei Tsuen is a walled village in Lam Tei, Tuen Mun District, Hong Kong.

Administration
Lam Tei Tsuen is a recognized village under the New Territories Small House Policy. It is one of the 36 villages represented within the Tuen Mun Rural Committee. For electoral purposes, Lam Tei Tsuen is part of the Tuen Mun Rural constituency, which is currently represented by Kenneth Cheung Kam-hung.

History
Several villages of the Lam Tei area were established by the To Clan. Originally from Poyang, Jiangxi (other sources mention Watlam in Guangxi), the To Clan moved to Ngau Tam Mei and then to Tuen Mun Tai Tsuen. Following the increase of the clan population, the village dispersed and developed into five villages in the Lam Tei area: Nai Wai, Tsing Chuen Wai, Tuen Tsz Wai, Lam Tei Tsuen and Tuen Mun San Tsuen, which were all fortified.

See also
 Walled villages of Hong Kong

References

External links

 Delineation of area of existing village Lam Tei (Tuen Mun) for election of resident representative (2019 to 2022)

Walled villages of Hong Kong
Lam Tei
Villages in Tuen Mun District, Hong Kong